Platy railway station is the railway station of Platy in Imathia, Central Macedonia, Greece. The station is served by Intercity trains between Athens and Thessaloniki and since 9 September 2007 by Thessaloniki Suburban services or Proastiakos to Katerini and Larissa, Edessa, Florina and Thessaloniki.

History
Opened in 1894 in what was then the Ottoman Empire, at the completion of the Société du Chemin de Fer ottoman Salonique-Monastir, a branchline of the Chemins de fer Orientaux from Thessaloniki to Bitola. During this period Northern Greece and the southern Balkans were still under Ottoman rule, and Adendro was known as Kirtzilar. Adendro was annexed by Greece on 18 October 1912 during the First Balkan War. On 17 October 1925, The Greek government purchased the Greek sections of the former Salonica Monastir railway, and the railway became part of the Hellenic State Railways, with the remaining section north of Florina seeded to Yugoslavia. In 1970 OSE became the legal successor to the SEK, taking over responsibilities for most of Greece's rail infrastructure. On 1 January 1971, the station and most of the Greek rail infrastructure were transferred to the Hellenic Railways Organisation S.A., a state-owned corporation. Freight traffic declined sharply when the state-imposed monopoly of OSE for the transport of agricultural products and fertilisers ended in the early 1990s. Many small stations of the network with little passenger traffic were closed down. In 2001 the infrastructure element of OSE was created, known as GAIAOSE; it would henceforth be responsible for the maintenance of stations, bridges and other elements of the network, as well as the leasing and the sale of railway assists. In 2003, OSE launched "Proastiakos SA", as a subsidiary to serve the operation of the suburban network in the urban complex of Athens during the 2004 Olympic Games. In 2005, TrainOSE was created as a brand within OSE to concentrate on rail services and passenger interface.

On 9 September 2007, the station reopened. Since 2007, the station is served by the Proastiakos Thessaloniki services to New Railway Station. In 2008, all Proastiakos were transferred from OSE to TrainOSE. In 2009, with the Greek debt crisis unfolding OSE's Management was forced to reduce services across the network. Timetables were cut back, and routes closed as the government-run entity attempted to reduce overheads. In 2017 OSE's passenger transport sector was privatised as TrainOSE, currently, a wholly owned subsidiary of Ferrovie dello Stato Italiane infrastructure, including stations, remained under the control of OSE.

Facilities
The station has waiting rooms and a staffed ticket office within the original 19th-century building. As of (2020) The station is staffed with a working ticket office. The station currently has four platforms; however, only three are currently in regular use. There are waiting rooms on platform one and waiting shelters on 2/3. Access to the platforms is via a subway under the lines. The platforms have shelters with seating; however, there are no Dot-matrix display departure and arrival screens or timetable poster boards on the platforms. The station, however, does have a buffet. There is also Parking in the forecourt.

Services
The station is served by Regional stopping services to Palaiofarsalos and Thessaloniki, Express trains to Kalambaka and Florina and InterCity services between Athens and Thessaloniki, and since 9 September 2007 by Proastiakos Thessaloniki services to Katerini and Larissa, Edessa, and Thessaloniki.

Station layout

See also
 Proastiakos
 P.A.Th.E./P.

References

Railway stations in Central Macedonia
Railway stations opened in 1894
Buildings and structures in Imathia